Michael Robert Prior (born November 14, 1963) is a former American football safety who played for the Tampa Bay Buccaneers, Indianapolis Colts and Green Bay Packers in the National Football League (NFL). He played college football at Illinois State.

He currently serves as the Youth Football Commissioner for the Indianapolis Colts.

Early years
Prior attended Marian Catholic High School in Chicago Heights, Illinois where he played football, baseball, and wrestling. Prior played both football and baseball at Illinois State, setting the school record for batting average at .388. He also set the school record in punt return yardage and had his No. 15 jersey retired by the football team. Immediately following his college career, Prior was drafted by the Los Angeles Dodgers in the fourth round of the 1985 Major League Baseball Draft and the Tampa Bay Buccaneers in the seventh round of the 1985 NFL Draft. He was also drafted by the Baltimore Orioles in the 18th round of the 1984 draft and by the Houston Astros in the fourth round of the 1986 secondary draft. Prior chose football because it would be easier to raise a family and involve less traveling than working through baseball's minor leagues.

Professional career

Tampa Bay Buccaneers
Prior played his rookie season with the Tampa Bay Buccaneers in 1985. He almost made the starting lineup at safety, but the late add of David Greenwood relegated Prior to mainly special teams action as a member of the Bucs. A fractured wrist sustained in a preseason game against the Washington Redskins landed him on injured reserve; he was waived from that list in October.

Indianapolis Colts
Prior joined the Indianapolis Colts in February 1987. He was cut by the team on September 1, but later returned as a replacement player in the 1987 NFL Strike, starting three games. After the strike ended, the team retained him, initially utilizing Prior on special teams but later moving him up to a defensive starter. In 1989, Prior intercepted a Bernie Kosar pass and returned it for a touchdown in overtime to help the Colts defeat the Cleveland Browns. He was named AFC Defensive Player of the Week for his exploits. In 1990, Prior caught his first NFL pass on a successful fake punt attempt. Prior was injured early in the 1991 season, and was placed on the injured reserve list in October. He stayed with team through the 1992 season and then became a free agent.

Green Bay Packers
Prior signed with the Green Bay Packers in April 1993. The team brought him on as a replacement for the recently departed Chuck Cecil. In his debut season, Prior moved into the punt returner role late in the year when Robert Brooks was injured. Injuries in the defensive backfield led to an increased late-season role in 1994. Prior nabbed an interception in Super Bowl XXXI. He was released by the team before the 1998 season but was quickly re-signed. The Packers did not re-sign Prior after the season.

After football
Prior is married with three daughters. He graduated from Illinois State with a degree in business administration. Prior was previously athletic director for St. Luke School in Indianapolis. He has served as the Youth Football Commissioner for the Indianapolis Colts since 2005. and is also an assistant football coach at Cathedral High School in Indianapolis.

References

1963 births
Living people
People from Chicago Heights, Illinois
American football safeties
Illinois State Redbirds football players
Tampa Bay Buccaneers players
Indianapolis Colts players
Green Bay Packers players
Sportspeople from Cook County, Illinois
Players of American football from Illinois
National Football League replacement players